Mumbles Rangers Football Club is an amateur Welsh football team based in Mumbles, Swansea, Wales. They play in the Ardal SW which is in the third tier of the Welsh football league system.

History
Formed in 1950 by Billy Johns, BEM, the team played in the Swansea Senior Football League until the 2020–21 season when the club joined the newly formed tier 4 West Wales Premier League. On 9 June 2022, it was announced that the club had been promoted to the tier 3 Ardal SW League for the 2022–23 season.

References

External links
Club official twitter
official facebook
Club website

Football clubs in Wales
West Wales Premier League clubs
Sport in Swansea
Association football clubs established in 1950
1950 establishments in Wales
Swansea Senior League clubs
Football clubs in Swansea
Ardal Leagues clubs